Sheela, also known as Pind Di Kurhi, sometimes spelled as Pind Di Kuri or Sheila, is a 1935 Punjabi film directed by K.D. Mehra. It is the first Punjabi sound film and was made in Calcutta and released in Lahore. Mubarak Ali Khan and K.D. Mehra composed the music. Baby Noor Jehan was first time introduced as an actress and singer.

See also
Heer Ranjha first Punjabi feature film in 1932 directed by Abdur Rashid Kardar.

References

External links

1935 films
Punjabi-language Indian films
1930s Punjabi-language films
Indian black-and-white films